The 2015 Tequila Patrón Sports Car Showcase was a sports car race sanctioned by the International Motor Sports Association (IMSA). It was held at Long Beach street circuit in Long Beach, California on 18 April 2015. The race was the third round of the 2015 Tudor United SportsCar Championship.

Background 
The event was run as a support race to the Grand Prix of Long Beach, the annual IndyCar Series race held at the circuit. The Pirelli World Challenge and Stadium Super Trucks also ran during the weekend. The race was also the joint-shortest of the season, at just 100 minutes, identical to the Chevrolet Sports Car Classic.

Entries 

A total of 17 cars took part in the event; 9 in the Prototype (P) class and 8 in the GT Le Mans (GTLM) class. The Prototype Challenge (PC) and GT Daytona (GTD) classes would not be participating in the event. After only competing on permanent circuits since its competition debut in 2012, The DeltaWing would make its first appearance at a street course.  Due to scheduling conflicts for full-season drivers Nick Tandy and Earl Bamber, who were preparing for their LMP1 debut in the FIA World Endurance Championship, drivers Frédéric Makowiecki and Richard Lietz would replace them for the Long Beach event.

Results 

References 

2015 United SportsCar Championship season
United SportsCar Championship
Tequila Patrón Sports Car Showcase